Ixonympha is a genus of moths of the family Tortricidae.

Species
Ixonympha hyposcopa (Lower, 1905)

See also
List of Tortricidae genera

References

External links
tortricidae.com

Tortricidae genera
Taxa named by Marianne Horak
Olethreutinae